Adast is a village and commune in the Hautes-Pyrénées department in southwestern France. It is in Sent Savin valley in the Bigorre region.

Geography
The commune is bordered by four other communes. It also borders Lau-Balagnas by a simple quadripoint: Saint-Savin to the west, Lau-Balagnas by a quadripoint to the north, Beaucens to the east, and finally by Pierrefitte-Nestalas to the south.

Population

Sites and monuments
In 1270, the Château de Miramont was bequeathed after the death of Mathe de Bigorre-Mâtas to one of his daughters, Marguerite.

In the 17th Century, it became the refuge of the poet Cyprian Despourrins whose mother was Gabrielle de Miramont. The castle was then bought by Bernard Abadie-Gaye, an inhabitant of Sazos (near Luz-Saint-Sauveur). It was then sold by a descendant of this family, Célestin Carrere, son of Louise Abadie-Gaye, in 1914.

The château was later inhabited by Dr. Jean François Calot (1861-1944), a surgeon who advanced orthopaedic surgery preferring conservative treatments to the systematic amputations. He spent his entire career from 1890 at Berck and he retired to the Château de Miramont.

At the end of the 1960s, the Château de Miramont was bought by the journalist, radio and television host Jacques Chancel, who came from the nearby village of Ayzac-Ost.

See also
Communes of the Hautes-Pyrénées department

References

Communes of Hautes-Pyrénées